BRB Internacional S.A.U was a Spanish licensing and production company of animated television series as Around the World with Willy Fog, Dogtanian and the Three Muskehounds and The World of David the Gnome. On 31 January 2018, WildBrain, a leading digital kids’ network & studio, has been appointed the exclusive global manager of BRB Internacional's extensive catalogue of kids’ content on YouTube. In November 2022, the company closed after filing for bankruptcy. DeAPlaneta acquired the company's library in January 2023.

History 
The name BRB comes after its three founders: Claudio Biern Boyd, José Luis Rodríguez and Títo Bastoas, who founded BRB Internacional SAU on July 19, 1972 as a merchandising agency in Spain – where the company is headquartered – Alcobendas, Madrid, Spain. At first, BRB bought distribution rights in Spain to some of popular characters of foreign studios such as Hanna-Barbera and Warner Bros., short film and television series as The Pink Panther, Tom and Jerry, The Muppets and Charlie's Angels. In 1975, BRB began licensing and distributing animation series both domestically and worldwide, including The Wood of Tallac, Banner and Flappy and Tom Sawyer, all anime series made by Nippon Animation Co., Ltd. in Japan, to start beginning BRB's long relationship with the Japanese animation studio.

After seeing a steady growth in this sector, BRB decided to start producing their own cartoon series, but delegating the whole animation process to other companies. Started with Nippon Animation with Ruy, the Little Cid, premiered in 1980 on  Televisión Española  (in Japan in 1984). Other series co-produced with Nippon Animation were Dogtanian, Willy Fogg and Football Stories (with Naranjito, the official mascot of 1982 FIFA World Cup). In 1985, BRB contracted Wang Films Productions in Taiwan their first international hit: The World of David the Gnome, aired in the United States on Nickelodeon's Nick Jr. block two years later. The company continued to produce new cartoon series, including Iron Kid ("Eon Kid" in the United States), Suckers and Canimals.

After that, they continued licensing successful foreign properties' rights in Spain including Pokémon, Pepsi, and The Pink Panther. Their most recent projects by Screen 21 SA was Super Bernard, a theatrical film based on their short-form series Bernard. However it fell to bankruptcy during the mid-2010s. BRB now has a new division called Apolo Films for the future of the brand. The studio's first film is a reboot of their Dogtanian franchise which was released in 2021.

In 2023, the company's catalog was acquired by DeAPlaneta Entertainment.

Animated television programs 
 Ruy, the Little Cid (1980) – made by Nippon Animation, Japan
 Dogtanian and the Three Muskehounds (1981)
 The Return of Dogtanian (1989)
 (Series 1) made by Nippon Animation, Japan
 (Series 2) made by  Thames TV, UK; Wang Film Productions, Taiwan
 Futbol en Acción
 Around the World with Willy Fog
 (Series 1) (1981–1983) made by Nippon Animation, Japan
 Willy Fog 2 (1993)
 (Series 2) made by Wang Film Productions, Taiwan
 The World of David the Gnome (1985–1987) – made by CINAR, Wang Film Productions, Taiwan, and Miramax Films
 Wisdom of the Gnomes – made by CINAR, and Miramax Films (1987–1988)
 Bobobobs (1988)
 A Thousand and One… Americas (1991)
 Sandokan (1992)
 Mort and Phil (1994) – co-production with RTL Television, Germany, and Wang Film Productions, Taiwan
 The Mozart Band – co-production with Marathon Animation, France and Wang Film Productions, Taiwan (1995)
 The Untouchables of Elliot Mouse (1997)
 The New World of the Gnomes (1997)
 Super Models (1998)
 Football Stories (1998)
 Teo – co-production with "Violeta Denou" (1999)
 Yolanda: Daughter of the Black Corsair (1999)
 Fantaghirò (1999)
 Toonimals! (2001)
 Nico (AKA: "Nicholas") (2001)
 Gladiator Academy (2002)
 Zipi y Zape (a.k.a. "Zip and Zap") (2002)
 Nouvelles aventures de l'homme invisible, Les ("The New Adventures of the Invisible Man") – co-production with Antefilms (now Moonscoop) (2005)
 Papawa (2005)
 Bernard (2005)
 Iron Kid – co-production with Manga Entertainment (2005)
 Angus and Cheryl (2006)
 The Imp (2006) 
 Olympic Bernard (2008)
 Suckers (2010)
 Kambu (2010)
 Canimals (2011)
 Zoobabu (2011)
 Khuda-Yana (2011)
 Bernard II (2012)
 Yup Yups (2013)
 Chop Chop Ninja (2014)
 Invizimals (2014)
 Mica (2014)
 Ruff-Ruff, Tweet and Dave (2015, YouTube distribution only)
 Cracked (2016)
 Filly Funtasia (2019; started production in 2012 and ceased production on their part around 2016)
 Miss Bellyfoo (2021)
 Dogtanian the Hero (TBA)
 Untitled The Witcher series (TBA)

Animated movies 
 Dogtanian: The TV Special (1981) (TV movie based on the first series)
 Dogtanian: One For All and All For One (1995)
 Willy Fog
 Around the World in 80 Days (1995)
 Journey to the Center of the Earth (1995)
 20,000 Leagues Under the Sea (1995)
 Sandokan: The Princess and the Pirate (1995)
 David the Gnome
 The Tiny Little World of David the Gnome (1995)
 The Gnomes' Great Adventure (1995 redub)
 The Gnomes' Amazing Journeys (1997)
 The Gnomes' Adventures in the Snow (1997)
 Music For Your Eyes By The Mozart Band (1997)
 Elliot Mouse: The Untouchables vs. Al Catone (1998)
 Yolanda: Secret of the Black Rose (2000)
 Fantaghirò: Quest for the Kuorum (2000)
 Football Stories: The Official Rules of Football (2001)
 Toonimals: Wild Records! The Greatest Animal Records (2001)
 Ruy the Little Cid (2004)
 Nicholas (or Nico): The TV Movie (2005)
 Gladiator Academy: the Movie (2005)
 The Adventures of Zip and Zap: Meet the Monsters (2005)

 Live-action movies 
 La princesa de Kaphurtala Marqués mendigo Un difunto, seis mujeres y un taller Atropello Dentro del Paraiso Los recuerdos de Alicia Ambiciones' Live-action TV 
 Los Sabios ("The Wise ones"), in TVE (using characters and animation from the anime series Mīmu Iro Iro Yume no Tabi)
 ¿Y tú bailas? ("And you dance?", 1998), in T5
 Tentaciones ("Temptations"), in Antena 3
 Gran Splash ("Great Splash"), in TVE
 Pokemanía, in T5 (using characters and animation from Pokémon)
 La hora animada ("Animated Hour")

 Feature films 
 Dogtanian and the Three Muskehounds (2021)
 Around the World with Willy Fog (2023)
 The Gnomes (TBA)
 Super Bernard''

Awards 

 BEST EUROPEAN PRODUCER-Nomination – CARTOON FORUM 2009
 Best Agent of the Year (2009) for Cartoon Network Enterprises.
 Best Agent of the Year (2008) for Cartoon Network Enterprises.
 Nominated for "Best producer of the Year" Kidscreen magazine (2007)
 Gran Vía Award (2008), for "Around the World with Willy Fog. The Musical"

References 
11.  New Dogtanian TV Series is in development

External links 
 BRB Internacional
 
 

Spanish animation studios
Mass media companies established in 1972
Mass media companies disestablished in 2022
Companies based in the Community of Madrid
Spanish companies established in 1972
WildBrain